In Sami mythology, Mano, Manno, Aske, or Manna is a personification of the Moon as a female deity.

The Sami worldview is animistic in nature, with shamanistic features, and in that worldview their divinities occupied important positions. Every force of nature is associated with a god or goddess, and sources of livelihood are believed to be safeguarded by beings in the spiritual world that can be persuaded to be more favourable.

Like other nature-deities, the goddess Mano is seen as unpredictable and dangerous. She is worshiped around the time of the new moon, especially around the Winter Solstice, and during that time it is taboo to make any kind of noise.

Christian missionaries and priests normally did not understand these Pagan concepts but regarded them as Satanic. The Sami were forcibly converted to Christianity and shamanistic practices forbidden.

Sami spirituality brings unearthliness—the spiritual world—to the Sami. The shaman is the intermediary between this world and the spiritual. Some Sami shamans have Noaidi drums, and at least one such drum with a Mano Moon symbol has been discovered.

See also
 List of lunar deities

References

Lunar goddesses
Sámi goddesses
Sky and weather goddesses